Llobet is a surname of Catalan origin and may refer to:

Joan Serra Llobet (1927–2015), Spanish water polo player 
Miguel Llobet (1878–1938), Spanish classical guitarist
Toni Llobet, Catalan artist and illustrator of several bird and wildlife books
Xavier Llobet (born 1974), Spanish triathlete

Catalan-language surnames